1997 in the Philippines details events of note that happened in the Philippines in the year 1997.

Incumbents

 President: Fidel Ramos (Lakas)
 Vice President: Joseph Estrada (NPC)
 Senate President: Ernesto Maceda
 House Speaker: Jose de Venecia, Jr.
 Chief Justice: Andres Narvasa
 Philippine Congress: 10th Congress of the Philippines

Events

March
 March 26 – Las Piñas becomes a highly urbanized city in Metro Manila through ratification of Republic Act 8251 which was approved last February 12.

June
 June 22 – President Fidel V. Ramos signs Proclamation No. 1030, that declaring the Philippine tarsier (Scientific name: Carlito syrichta) as a specially protected faunal species of the Philippines.

July
 July 11 – The Philippines begin to experience the effect of the Asian financial crisis; the peso devalues by 11.5% with the peso-dollar rate recorded at ₱29.45. Further depreciation causes the Philippine Stock Exchange composite index to go down, and mainly affects the country's economic growth, with annual nominal GDP per capita drops by 12.5% from the previous year. The crisis affects numerous  countries in East and Southeast Asia.
 July 16 – Sisters Marijoy and Jacqueline Chiong were abducted and killed in Cebu City, the suspects were later sentenced to death, which in turn would lead to the abolition of death penalty in 2006.

August
 August 2 – Kabankalan becomes a city in the province of Negros Occidental through ratification of Republic Act 8297 which was approved last June 6.
 August 19 – Agila-2 communications satellite was launched from China and began commercial service. It is the first satellite of the country not acquired while in orbit.

September
 September 4 – Simultaneous bomb explosions in Manila and Bulacan kill six and injure 105, mostly commuters.
 September 22 – Two overloaded PNR trains collide in Muntinlupa City, killing nine and injuring around 200; one of the country's worst train accidents.
 September 25 – A clash between the armed men of Gov. Abdusakur Tan and Jolo Mayor Sout Tan occurs at Maimbung and Indanan towns in Sulu, killing 17 supporters from both rivals.
 September 30 – Anti-Rape Law (Republic Act 8353) is passed.

October
 October 5 – A cargo truck collides into a mini-bus in Tampilisan, Zamboanga del Norte with 25 people reportedly killed in what police considered as the worst road accident in the Zamboanga Peninsula area.
 October 6 – Moro Islamic Liberation Front (MILF) conducts an execution of two individuals, who had been "sentenced to death" for multiple criminal charges, in Masiu, Lanao del Sur, said to be done by the virtue of the Islamic laws, causing public criticisms.
 October 27 – Pres. Ramos signs a law (RA 8368), repealing the Anti-Squatting Law (Presidential Decree 772); decriminalizing squatting but maintaining sanctions against professional squatters and squatting syndicates.
 October 28 – Pres. Ramos signs a law (RA 8369) creating special courts for the cases involving children and family relations.
 October 29 – Pres. Ramos signs Indigenous Peoples' Rights Act (RA 8371), a law protecting the rights of the indigenous sector to their ancestral domains, and creating the National Commission on Indigenous Peoples.

November
 November 5 – The Supreme Court votes, 9–2, to declare a law (RA 8180) ending government regulatory control of the oil industry as unconstitutional.
 November 12 – A clash between MILF rebels and armed guards of a coconut plantation in Maguindanao ends with the deaths of Amin Cusain, an MILF leader, seven rebels and two civilians.

December
 December 22 – Pres. Ramos signed seven social reform bills into law, including computerization of the electoral process in the next year and subsequent general elections (RA 8436) and autonomy for the Cordilleras.
 December 26 – Heavy rains cause the collapse of the gold mine tunnels in Mount Diwata, Monkayo, then part of Davao del Norte; five are rescued; later reports confirm that 80 miners are killed.

Holidays

As per Executive Order No. 292, chapter 7 section 26, the following are regular holidays and special days, approved on July 25, 1987. Note that in the list, holidays in bold are "regular holidays" and those in italics are "nationwide special days".

 January 1 – New Year's Day
 March 27 – Maundy Thursday
 March 28 – Good Friday
 April 9 – Araw ng Kagitingan (Day of Valor)
 May 1 – Labor Day
 June 12 – Independence Day 
 August 31 – National Heroes Day
 November 1 –  All Saints Day
 November 30 – Bonifacio Day
 December 25 – Christmas Day
 December 30 – Rizal Day
 December 31 – Last Day of the Year

In addition, several other places observe local holidays, such as the foundation of their town. These are also "special days."

Sports
 October 11–19 – The Philippines participated at the 1997 Southeast Asian Games.
 November 22–23 – The Philippines as hosting the 1997 Asian Judo Championships held in Manila.
 December 14 – The Alaska Milkmen won against Purefoods Carne Norte Beefies, 4 games to 1, to retain the 1997 PBA Governors Cup title.

Births
 January 14
 Agassi Ching, vlogger
 Denice Zamboanga, mixed martial artist
 January 20 – Kim Last, actor and That's My Bae contestant
 February 3 – Rhap Salazar, singer, songwriter and actor
 February 15 – Kit Thompson, actor
 February 17 – Kenzo Gutierrez, movie and TV actor, TV commercial, print and ramp model, student and football player
 March 10 – Julia Barretto, actress
 March 13 – Lou Yanong, actress and model
 April 14 – Rhen Escaño, actress
 April 22 – Carla Silva, actress, singer and dancer
 May 1 – Miles Ocampo, actress
 May 6:
Maymay Entrata, model, singer, composer, dancer and actress
Ranz Kyle, YouTube personality and dancer
 May 18 – Prince Clemente, model, actor and dancer
 June 17:
 Jameson Blake, actor and member of Hashtags
 Wilbert Ross, member of Hashtags
 June 26 – Louise Joy Folloso, actress
 July 2 – Jackie Buntan, Filipina-American Muay Thai kickboxer and former inaugural Muay Thai World Title challenger
 July 24 - Kendru Garcia, actor and rapper
 July 31:
 Abby Trinidad, model and member of MNL48
 Aya Fernandez, actress, model and beauty queen
 Barbie Forteza, actress and dancer
 EJ Laure, volleyball player
 August 5 – Jeremiah Tiangco, singer
 September 14 – Iñigo Pascual, actor and singer
 September 16 – Julian Trono, actor
 September 19 – Kobe Paras, basketball player
 September 22 – Maris Racal, actress, singer and dancer
 October 2 – Liezel Lopez, actress
 October 4 – Michelle Vito, actress
 October 7 – Joshua Garcia, actor
 October 12 – Jimboy Martin, actor and member of Hashtags
 October 16 – Leila Alcasid, singer-songwriter and actress
 October 20:
Nicole Dulalia, actress 
Manolo Pedrosa, actor and student
 October 22 – Kiara Takahashi, actress
 October 27 – Paulo Angeles, actor and member of Hashtags
 November 4 – Bea Binene, Filipina actress, broadcast journalist and television host
 November 24 – J Sitoy, drummer and pilot
 November 27 – Jeremiah Lisbo, actor
 November 28 – Claire Ruiz, actress
 December 1 – Karl Gabriel, actor
 December 4 – Ruru Madrid, actor
 December 17 – Jazz Ocampo, actress
 December 18 – Mikee Quintos, actress and singer
 December 20 – Mary Joy Apostol, actress
 December 24 – Diana Mackey, actress

Deaths
 February 7 – Jose Garcia Villa, Filipino poet, writer and painter, National Artist of the Philippines (b. 1908)
 February 14 – Miguel Rodriguez, actor and model (b. 1962)
 April 6 – Max Alvarado, actor (b. 1929)
 April 21 – Diosdado Macapagal, former President of the Philippines (b. 1910)
 June 27 – Cesar Alzona, former author (b. 1926)
 July 3 – Chiquito, actor and comedian (b. 1932)
 July 7 – Rolando Tinio, filipino poet, dramatist, actor, essayist, and educator (b. 1937)
 August 21 – Evelyn Joy Militante, radio-TV newscaster (b. 1972)
 October 7 – Felicisimo Ampon, tennis player (b. 1920)
 October 11 – Dencio Padilla, actor and comedian (b. 1929)
 December 31 – Gerard Fainsan, singer, actor and member Universal Motion Dancers (b. 1974)

Television

References

 
1997 in Southeast Asia
Philippines
1990s in the Philippines
Years of the 20th century in the Philippines